Chionodes agriodes is a moth in the family Gelechiidae. It is found in North America, where it has been recorded from southern Alberta and southern British Columbia to Utah, Colorado and California.

The wingspan is about 20 mm. The forewings are light grey irrorated dark grey and with the stigmata blackish-grey, the plical and first discal elongate, the plical somewhat anterior, the second discal roundish but with a fine projecting dash anteriorly. There is a marginal series of small cloudy blackish-grey spots around the posterior part of the costa and termen partly in the cilia. The hindwings are light bluish-grey.

References

Chionodes
Moths described in 1927
Moths of North America
Taxa named by Edward Meyrick